is a shōnen manga series by Kimio Yanagisawa. It won the 1979 Kodansha Manga Award for shōnen. It was adapted into a 1980 film directed by Shinji Sōmai and starring Shingo Tsurumi and Hiroko Yakushimaru.

Cast 
Shingo Tsurumi
Hiroko Yakushimaru
Toshinori Omi
Mariko Ishihara
Hiroshi Madoka
Hiroyuki Sanada
Mieko Harada

Awards
3rd Kodansha Manga Award
Won: Shōnen
2nd Yokohama Film Festival 
Won: Best Actress - Hiroko Yakushimaru
Won: Best New Director - Shinji Sōmai
Won: Best Screenplay - Shōichi Maruyama
2nd Best Film

References

External links 
 
 Tonda Couple at the Japanese Movie Database 

1978 manga
1980 films
Films directed by Shinji Sōmai
1980s Japanese-language films
Kodansha manga
Live-action films based on manga
Shōnen manga
Winner of Kodansha Manga Award (Shōnen)
1980s Japanese films